Onlsow Mountain is located on the border of Alberta and British Columbia on the Continental Divide.

History 

Onslow Mountain was named in 1917 by the Interprovincial Boundary Survey after the British Royal Navy ship  that took part in the Battle of Jutland in World War I. The mountain's name was officially adopted as Mount Onslow in 1924 by the Geographical Names Board of Canada and officially changed to Onslow Mountain in 1966.

See also
List of peaks on the Alberta–British Columbia border
Mountains of Alberta
Mountains of British Columbia

References

Onslow Mountain
Onslow Mountain
Canadian Rockies